Tagawa (written:  or  lit. "ricefield river") is a Japanese surname. Notable people with the surname include:

Cary-Hiroyuki Tagawa (born 1950), Japanese-American actor
Charlie Tagawa (1935-2017), Japanese-American musician
Félix Tagawa (born 1976), Tahitian footballer
, mother of Koxinga, conqueror of Taiwan
, Japanese politician
Shigeru Tagawa
, Japanese manga artist

Japanese-language surnames